Lohra may refer to:

Lohra, Bihar, India
Lohra, Germany
Lohra (megalithic tomb), near Lohra, Germany
Lohra (tribe), a tribe and social community in Jharkhand, India